Bob Yousefian is the former mayor of Glendale, California.

Biography 
Bob Yousefian was born in Iran, moved to Lebanon as a teenager and later followed his family to the United States.

On April 3, 2001, Yousefian won the election and became a member of city council in Glendale, California. Yousefian received 14.53% of the votes. In April 2004, Yousefian became the mayor of Glendale, California, until April 2005.

In August 2007, Yousefian was arrested.

See also
 History of the Armenian Americans in Los Angeles
 History of the Iranian Americans in Los Angeles

References

External links 
 Armenian National Committee of Glendale
 City of Glendale, CA : Glendale Mayors
 Bob Yousefian at ourcampaigns.com
 Community stands behind Murphy Councilwoman still well respected among residents, officials despite her recent arrest.

Living people
American people of Armenian descent
Iranian people of Armenian descent
Iranian emigrants to the United States
California city council members
1957 births
American politicians of Iranian descent
Mayors of Glendale, California
Ethnic Armenian politicians